Abdullahi Issa Mohamud (( 1922 – March 24, 1988) was a Somali politician. He was the Prime Minister of  Italian Somalia during the trusteeship period, serving from February 29, 1956, to July 1, 1960.

Biography
Issa was born in 1921 in the southern town of Afgooye.  

Nicknamed "Bidaar", Issa frequented an Italian primary institution in the capital, as well as a local Qur'anic school (madrassah). When the Second World War broke out, he was still a student.

Issa later relocated to the port of Merca at the age of sixteen, where he would work as a postal clerk from 1939 to 1941. He thereafter returned to Mogadishu and assumed a position in the Department of Economic Affairs. Following the British military occupation of Italian Somalia in the early 1940s, Issa was relieved from his duties. He then embarked on a business career.

After the turmoil of the war years, Issa joined the Somali Youth League (SYL) at its onset. He typified the Somali political elite of the period, as he was "young (age 38), intelligent, largely self-educated, confident, and determined". He quickly rose through the ranks to become one of the party's leaders. In 1948, he was appointed to the SYL's central committee, and eventually as its Secretary-General.

Issa later went to Paris and New York as an SYL delegate to proclaim the right of the Somali people to independence. From 1950 to 1954, he represented the SYL at the United Nations Trusteeship Council. After being appointed to office as an SYL deputy in the political elections of 1956, he was called in the same year to form Somalia's first government, thus becoming the nation's first Prime Minister.

Re-elected in 1959, he was re-confirmed as Premier, and held for some time also the portfolios of Foreign Affairs, Interior and Grace and justice. In the government formed after Somalia's independence in July 1960, Issa was later appointed Foreign Minister. In this capacity, he took part in many international conventions, in particular the United Nations General Assembly and the conferences in Addis Abeba, among other cities. With the conclusion of the general election of March 1964, Issa returned to the National Assembly as an SYL deputy for Beledweyne.

A few years later, the Supreme Revolutionary Council (SRC) seized power. The new military government subsequently appointed Issa as Somalia's Ambassador to Sweden in 1974. He held the position until early 1983, when he resigned from public office after a long career in politics.

Issa spent his retirement years in Rome, Italy. He died there in March 1988, and was transported to Mogadishu for burial.

See also
 Mohammed Awale Liban
Somali Youth League
Muhammad Haji Ibrahim Egal
Aden Abdullah Osman Daar
Haji Bashir Ismail Yusuf
Mohamed Hussein Roble

Notes

References

Somalia - Worldstatesmen.com

1921 births
1988 deaths
20th-century prime ministers of Somalia
Ethnic Somali people
Somali Youth League politicians
Prime Ministers of Somalia
Somali independence activists
Somalian expatriates in the United States